Saumitra Khan (born 8 December 1980) is an Indian politician representing the Bishnupur constituency of West Bengal in the Lok Sabha since 2014. He joined Bharatiya Janata Party in 2019  and currently (as of December 2020) serves as the president of Bharatiya Janata Yuva Morcha West Bengal.

Khan started his career with Indian National Congress party and was elected to West Bengal Legislative Assembly from Katulpur constituency. In 2013, he switched to the ruling Trinamool Congress. In the 2014 Indian general election, he was elected to the Lok Sabha from Bishnupur constituency. In early 2019, he defected to Bharatiya Janata Party, the ruling party at the centre. Following his defection, a police case was lodged against him for allegedly extorting money from job aspirants. The Kolkata High Court prevented him from entering his constituency. He won with a margin of more than 78,000 votes without even holding any political rally in the area.

Personal life
Khan was born in a Bengali Hindu family of Shunri jati on 8 December 1980 to Dhanonjoy Khan and Chhaya Rani Khan at Durlabhpur in Bankura district, West Bengal. He studied at Panchmura Mahavidyalaya. When his wife, Sujata Mondal Khan, joined the rival party, All India Trinamool Congress, Saumitra Khan filed divorce. And on 7.02.2023, with the order of the honorable court of Bankura he got divorced, This has led to an ongoing controversy in West Bengal politics. Another controversy occurred when he demanded a separate state of Junglemahal state.

Political career
In 2011 West Bengal Legislative Assembly election, Khan was elected to the assembly from Katulpur constituency as a candidate of the Indian National Congress party. On 12 December 2013, he announced his intention to join the ruling Trinamool Congress party. He alleged that the state Congress unit was ignoring the Bankura district. Four days later, he officially joined Trinamool Congress party.

In 2014 Indian general election, Khan was elected to the 16th Lok Sabha from Bishnupur constituency. After getting elected, he said that his priority as an MP would be to develop Bishnupur as a tourist spot and to protect the rights of workers who make Baluchari Sari. On 9 January 2019, he defected to Bharatiya Janata Party. Subsequently, he was expelled by his former party. The Times of India reported that Mukul Roy, who himself defected to the Bharatiya Janata Party played an important role in recruiting Khan. The "dynastic rule" in the Trinamool Congress and the political violence in the state were the reasons cited by Khan to switch parties.

In February 2019 it was alleged that Khan had extorted money from job aspirants on false promises. The Kolkata High Court announced that he could not be arrested though it prevented him from entering Bankura. In the following month, Khan was interrogated by the Bankura police. On 12 April, the Supreme Court of India refused to overturn the ban on him although he was allowed to enter the district for filing his nomination papers. In the absence of Khan, his wife Sujata Khan started campaigning for him for the upcoming general election. Khan managed to win from the same constituency with a margin of 78,047 votes even without holding any roadshow or addressing any political rally.

References

India MPs 2014–2019
People from Bishnupur district
Living people
Lok Sabha members from West Bengal
1980 births
People from Bankura district
India MPs 2019–present
Indian National Congress politicians from West Bengal
Trinamool Congress politicians from West Bengal
Bharatiya Janata Party politicians from West Bengal
West Bengal MLAs 2011–2016